The 2008–09 Georgian Cup (also known as the David Kipiani Cup) was the sixty-fifth season overall and nineteenth since independence of the Georgian annual football tournament. The competition began on 30 August 2008 and ended with the Final held on 30 May 2009. The defending champions are Zestafoni.

Round of 32
The first legs were played on 1 August and the second legs were played on 4 August 2008.

Section West

|}

Section East

|}

Round of 16
In this round entered winners from the previous round as well as three teams that finished first, second and third in last year's Umaglesi Liga: Dinamo Tbilisi, WIT Georgia and Zestafoni. The first legs were played on August 30 and 31 and the second legs were played on September 16 and 17, 2008.

|}

Quarterfinals
The matches were played on 12 November (first legs) and 26 November 2008 (second legs).

|}

Semifinals
The matches were played on 14 April (first legs) and 29 April 2009 (second legs).

|}

Final

See also 
 2008–09 Umaglesi Liga
 2008–09 Pirveli Liga

External links
 Official site 
 goli.ge 
 es.geofootball.com 

Georgian Cup seasons
Cup
Georgian Cup, 2008-09